Mankari (Mānkari or Maankari) is a hereditary title used by Maratha nobles and troops from the Indian subcontinent who held land grants, and cash allowances. They held an official position at the Darbar (court) and were entitled to certain ceremonial honours and presents rendered at courts, councils, weddings, festivals, village assemblies, etc. They were worthy of distinction and the honour bestowed upon them was the result of the military, bureaucratic or fiscal importance of them or their distinguished ancestors.

The term was widely used by Maratha nobility, who held important positions in various princely states of the Maratha Empire.

See also

Maratha Empire
Maratha titles
Indian honorifics
Indian feudalism
Sardar
Jagirdar
Zamindar
Princely state
Salute state
List of Indian Princely States
List of Maratha dynasties and states

References

External links

Indian feudalism
Titles in India
Noble titles
Royal titles
Social titles
Maratha Empire
Indian words and phrases
Marathi words and phrases
Urdu-language words and phrases
Positions of authority
High society (social class)
Oligarchy
Social class in India
Titles of national or ethnic leadership